The Voice of the Turtle may refer to:
 The Voice of the Turtle (play), 1943, by John William Van Druten
 The Voice of the Turtle (film), 1947, based on the stage play
 The Voice of the Turtle (album), 1968, by American folk musician John Fahey
 "Voice of the Turtle", a song by John Fahey on his album America
 Voice of the Turtle, a musical group specializing in Sephardic music
 "The Voice of the Turtle", a short story by W. Somerset Maugham, published in the collection The Mixture as Before 
 "The Voice of the Turtle", an episode of the television series Oh, Brother!

See also
 "And the Voice of the Turtle...", a short story by Sterling E. Lanier, published in the collection The Curious Quests of Brigadier Ffellowes
 The Song of Songs, the source of the phrase